Tremblay (French pronunciation: [tʁɑ̃blɛ]) may refer to:

Places
Tremblay River, a tributary of the rivière aux Anglais in Rivière-aux-Outardes, Quebec, Canada
Tremblay, Ille-et-Vilaine in the Ille-et-Vilaine department
Le Tremblay in the Maine-et-Loire department
Tremblay-en-France in the Seine-Saint-Denis department
Tremblay-les-Villages in the Eure-et-Loir department
Le Tremblay-Omonville in the Eure department
Le Tremblay-sur-Mauldre in the Yvelines department
Tremblay Park, an urban park in the commune of Champigny-sur-Marne (a part of Paris) 
 Tremblay, New Brunswick
 Tremblay, Quebec, former township municipality, now part of Saguenay, Quebec, Canada

Other
 Tremblay (surname)
Tremblay v Daigle, Canadian court case over abortion
Tremblay Commission, or Royal Commission of Inquiry on Constitutional Problems, a Quebec government report on Canada's constitution
 Tremblay station, an O-Train station in Ottawa, Ontario, Canada

French-language surnames